Events from the year 1724 in Great Britain.

Incumbents
 Monarch – George I
 Prime Minister – Robert Walpole (Whig)
 Parliament – 6th

Events

 20 February – première of Julius Caesar in Egypt, an Italian  opera by George Frideric Handel, takes place in London.
 6 April – Thomas Pelham-Holles, 1st Duke of Newcastle-upon-Tyne becomes Secretary of State for the Southern Department; Henry Pelham becomes Secretary at War.
 16 November – Jack Sheppard is hanged in London. (His partner-in-crime, highwayman Joseph "Blueskin" Blake, was similarly executed five days earlier.)

Unknown dates
 Blenheim Palace construction is completed. It is presented as a gift to the Duke of Marlborough for his involvement in the Battle of Blenheim in 1704.
 Longman, the oldest publishing house in England, is founded.

Publications
 Daniel Defoe's A tour thro' the whole island of Great Britain begins publication.
 Jonathan Swift's Drapier's Letters begin publication.
 Isaac Watts' textbook Logic.

Births
 24 January – Frances Brooke, writer (died 1789)
 28 February – George Townshend, 1st Marquess Townshend, field marshal (died 1807)
 19 May – Augustus Hervey, 3rd Earl of Bristol, admiral and politician (died 1779)
 3 June – John Gregory, physician, medical writer and moralist (died 1773)
 8 June – John Smeaton, civil engineer (died 1792)
 25 August – George Stubbs, painter (died 1806)
 3 September – Guy Carleton, 1st Baron Dorchester, soldier and Governor of Quebec (died 1808)
 31 October – Christopher Anstey, writer (died 1805)
 12 December – Samuel Hood, 1st Viscount Hood, admiral (died 1816)
 25 December – John Michell, scientist and geologist (died 1793)

Deaths
 1 January – Charles Gildon, critic and dramatist (born c. 1665)
 12 February – Elkanah Settle, writer (born 1648)
 21 May – Robert Harley, 1st Earl of Oxford and Mortimer, statesman (born 1661)
 15 June – Henry Sacheverell, churchman and politician (born 1674)
 29 October – William Wollaston, philosophical writer (born 1659)
 11 November – Joseph Blake (alias Blueskin), highwayman (executed) (born 1700) 
 16 November – Jack Sheppard, criminal (executed) (born 1702)
 29 November – Laurence Braddon, writer and politician (year of birth not known)
 27 December – Thomas Guy, philanthropist (born 1644)

References

 
Years in Great Britain